The Argentina women's national under-20 volleyball team represents Argentina in women's under-20 volleyball events, it is controlled and managed by the Argentinian Volleyball federation that is a member of South American volleyball body Confederación Sudamericana de Voleibol (CSV) and the international volleyball body government the Fédération Internationale de Volleyball (FIVB).

Results

FIVB U20 World Championship

 Champions   Runners up   Third place   Fourth place

South America U20 Championship

 Champions   Runners up   Third place   Fourth place

Pan-American U20 Cup

 Champions   Runners up   Third place   Fourth place

Current squad

The following is the Argentinean roster in the 2017 FIVB Volleyball Women's U20 World Championship.

Head Coach: Guillermo Caceres

Notable players

References

External links
www.feva.org.ar 

Volleyball
National women's under-20 volleyball teams
Volleyball in Argentina